Acrocyrtidus argenteofasciatus is a species of beetle in the family Cerambycidae. It is found in Asian countries including Vietnam.

References

Cerambycinae
Beetles described in 1903